Vice-Admiral Sir Thomas Francis Fremantle, 1st Freiherr von Fremantle,  (20 November 1765 – 19 December 1819) was a British naval officer in the Royal Navy whose accolades include three separate fleet actions, a close friendship with Lord Nelson, and a barony in Austria. He was the father of Admiral Sir Charles Fremantle, after whom the city Fremantle, in Western Australia, is named.

Early career
Fremantle was born in 1765, son of John Fremantle, of Aston Abbotts, Buckinghamshire, and Frances, daughter of John Edwards, of Bristol. His younger brother was the politician Sir William Fremantle. He joined the navy in 1777 aged eleven, aboard the frigate HMS Hussar. Profiting from family influence, active commissions in the American War of Independence and a keen sense of seamanship and aggressive tactical awareness, promotion came easily. He was made a lieutenant on 13 March 1782 while on duty in Jamaica and promoted to commander on 13 November 1790, in command of the sloop HMS Spitfire.

He was then in a good position to profit from the mass promotions that accompanied the outbreak of the French Revolutionary War in 1793, being made a post-captain on 16 May 1793 in the small frigate HMS Tartar. In this ship he first came to the notice of Horatio Nelson, when they both served at the Siege of Bastia. During the siege, Nelson lost an eye and Fremantle gained a reputation for daring, taking his ship under the fortress walls despite heavy fire from above which had already sunk one frigate in the bay.

The following year Fremantle commanded the frigate HMS Inconstant and was engaged in Lord Hotham's indecisive and cautious fleet action in the Gulf of Genoa on 14 March 1795. The French fleet had departed from Toulon and were making for the Italian coast, pursued by Hotham's fleet and an approaching storm. Fremantle, despite unspoken rules of engagement which did not require him to engage ships larger than his own, used his superior speed to overtake the 80-gun Ça Ira, which had been damaged in a collision. By taking his ship under the massive bow of his opponent, he managed to slow her enough for the oncoming British fleet to capture her and another French ship that had turned back in a rescue attempt. The first British ship to the scene was Nelson's HMS Agamemnon, and respect between the two officers was further enhanced.

Companion of Nelson
At Nelson's request, Fremantle was a companion and junior officer when he was detached to Italy in 1796. They wreaked havoc along the Italian coastline and evacuated British and royalist civilians to Corsica when the French army invaded. They took coastal positions and raided shore installations, capturing the island of Elba. One of the British refugees whom Fremantle rescued from Livorno was the 18-year-old Catholic Betsey Wynne, daughter of Richard Wynne (from the Anglo-Venetian Wynne family, acquainted with Casanova) and Camille de Royer. Fremantle married Betsey that year, with Prince Augustus as his best man. The same year he was embroiled in an engagement with Spanish gunboats off Cadiz, again under Nelson, and the next year he was with him at the disastrous Battle of Tenerife, where both were grievously wounded in the arm. Nelson's was amputated; Fremantle's survived, but he never regained full use of it.

While convalescing at home, Fremantle honed his theories of successful command at sea, shown by several proposals he sent to the Admiralty concerning the judgement of petty disciplinary actions on board ship. Although these were rejected, they would later be used as models when the disciplinary system was revised in the 1850s. A very popular officer with his men, his contemporaries and the public alike, Fremantle did not remain at home long. When Nelson took command of the Channel Fleet, Fremantle joined him in August 1800 as commander of the ship of the line HMS Ganges. With this ship he received further accolades for his service at the Battle of Copenhagen in 1801. He also dabbled in politics, standing unsuccessfully for the constituency of Sandwich in 1802, then winning it in 1806.

Sent to Ireland and then Ferrol in 1803 and 1804, Fremantle was given the massive 98-gun HMS Neptune in May 1805 and attached to the Cadiz blockade, ready for Nelson's assumption of command later that year. At the Battle of Trafalgar that October, Neptune was third in Nelson's division. He cut the Combined Fleet shortly after HMS Victory did, and ploughing past the wrecked Bucentaure engaged the massive Santissima Trinidad. The fighting left Neptune with 44 casualties and the outnumbered Spanish ship with over 300. Relatively undamaged, Neptune was able to tow the shattered Victory back to Gibraltar and Fremantle profited by taking the chapel silver from the big Spanish ship, which he used to adorn his home.

Political career
Fremantle spent the next five years in England, as a member of Parliament for Sandwich 1806–1807 and a Lord of the Admiralty (1806–1807), before being posted rear-admiral and taking command in the Adriatic Sea, where he employed the frigate squadrons under him successfully against French-held Italy and Dalmatia. When the French empire surrendered in 1814, the entire Balkan coast surrendered to him with over 800 ships, netting Fremantle a vast fortune. For his services he was made a Knight Grand Cross of the Order of the Bath on 12 April 1815, as well as a baron of the Austrian Empire and later a vice-admiral and, from 1818, the Commander-in-Chief, Mediterranean Fleet. He also received several Austrian and Italian knighthoods and initiation into the Royal Guelphic Order of Hanover. Fremantle died in December 1819 from a sudden illness and was buried at Naples, where his grave can be seen in the Garden of Don Carlo Califano outside the gate of San Gennaro, Naples.

His sons
He had at least four sons; the eldest, Thomas was a politician and succeeded to his father's baronetcy on his death. He was later made Baron Cottesloe for his own services to England. Another son, Charles Fremantle, became the captain of the 26-gun frigate , the first ship to arrive in a fleet of three ships sent out from Britain to establish a colony at the Swan River in Western Australia. The Australian city of Fremantle is named after him.

References

Further reading
 The Trafalgar Captains, Colin White and the 1805 Club, Chatham Publishing, London, 2005,

External links
 A biography from dukesofbuckingham.org
 Animation of the Battle of Trafalgar

|-

of the Austrian Empire

1765 births
1819 deaths
Royal Navy vice admirals
Members of the Parliament of the United Kingdom for English constituencies
Knights Grand Cross of the Order of the Bath
Lords of the Admiralty
Military personnel from Buckinghamshire
Royal Navy captains at the Battle of Trafalgar
Royal Navy personnel of the American Revolutionary War
Royal Navy personnel of the French Revolutionary Wars
Royal Navy personnel of the Napoleonic Wars
UK MPs 1806–1807
People from Buckinghamshire
Barons of Austria